The Chair of the NATO Military Committee (CMC) is the head of the NATO Military Committee, which advises the North Atlantic Council (NAC) on military policy and strategy. The CMC is the senior military spokesperson of the 30-nation alliance and principal advisor to the Secretary General. The Chair is one of the foremost officials of NATO, next to the Secretary General and the Supreme Allied Commander Europe. The CMC is assisted by the Deputy Chair, who advises the Deputy Secretary General and serves as the principal agent for coordination of nuclear, biological, and chemical matters for the Military Committee. Originally titled the Chairman, the post was redesignated in 2021 to reflect the gender-neutrality of the post.

The current Chair of the NATO Military Committee is lieutenant admiral Rob Bauer, former Chief of Defence of the Netherlands, who took office on 25 June 2021.

Origins
In accordance with Article 9 of the North Atlantic Treaty and the guidance given by the Working Group on the North Atlantic Treaty Organization during the first Council session in Washington in 1949, the Defence Committee rapidly established the Military Committee. During its few sessions held behind closed doors in Washington, the Military Committee gave policy guidance on military matters to the Standing Group, and advice on military questions to the Defence Committee and other bodies, and it recommended military measures for the unified defence of the North Atlantic region to the Defence Committee. The Military Committee was directly subordinate to the Defence Committee, and each member nation was represented by its chief of staff or a deputy. Iceland, which had no military forces, was represented by a civilian. Each member state in turn held the Chair of the Military Committee for one year (C1 D-1/2, DC 1/2).

Two other groups which also sat in Washington came directly under the Military Committee:
the Standing Group, the executive body, set up at the beginning, responsible for Military Committee everyday business;
the Military Representatives Committee (MRC), created at the end of 1950, to ensure communication of information and points of view between the Standing Group and Alliance member states not represented on it.

Appointment
The Chair of the Military Committee is elected from among the NATO Chiefs of Defence and appointed for a three-year term of office. He must have served as Chief of defence – or an equivalent capacity – in his own country and is traditionally a non-US officer of four-star rank or national equivalent.

The Chair of the Military Committee chairs all meetings and acts in an international capacity. In his absence, the Deputy Chair of the Military Committee takes the chair.

List
Since the formation of NATO, its Military Chairmen have been:

NATO Military Committee in Chiefs-of-Staff Session (1949–1963)

NATO Military Committee in Permanent Session (1958–1963)

NATO Military Committee (1963–present)

See also
NATO Military Committee
Chairman of the European Union Military Committee
International Military Staff
Supreme Allied Commander Europe

References

Further reading 
Douglas S. Bland, 'The Military Committee of the North Atlantic Alliance: A Study of Structure and Strategy,' New York, Praeger, 1991.

NATO military appointments
NATO Military Committee